Trevor John Perrett (born 2 August 1941 in Kingaroy, Queensland) is a former Australian politician. He was a member of the Legislative Assembly of Queensland from 1988 to 1998, representing the electorate of Barambah. Perrett was elected at the 1988 Barambah state by-election as the Citizens Electoral Council candidate. In December 1988 he switched to the Nationals. He represented the seat until his defeat by One Nation candidate Dorothy Pratt at the 1998 state election.

Perrett was Minister for Primary Industries, Fisheries and Forestry in the government of Rob Borbidge from 1996 to 1998, but was caught out having a sexual relationship lasting several years with a prostitute, Colleen Jefferies, who was found dead in her Brisbane home in 1996 in suspicious circumstances.

References

1941 births
Living people
Members of the Queensland Legislative Assembly
National Party of Australia members of the Parliament of Queensland
People from Kingaroy
Australian Citizens Party politicians